Hepburn is a town in Saskatchewan, Canada, approximately 45 kilometres north of Saskatoon.

History 
Hepburn was settled in the early 20th century as a railroad station. Connection made the community grow overnight and many people moved to the area. Before the 1930s the population of Hepburn had reached over 800 people. In the 1930s, the area was affected by both the great depression and a huge drought affecting most of Western Canada. Many of Hepburn's residents and farmers left the area. By the end of the decade, the population was less than 300.

In the 1940s, the community sent over 60 men to serve in World War II. After the war, Hepburn started to grow, and new homes were built. In 1989, the province shut down the railroad line, stranding three grain elevators. Like most Saskatchewan grain elevators, two were torn down but one remained, being converted into a museum about the history of Hepburn and of Saskatchewan.

Demographics 

Education

Hepburn was home to a small Bible college called Bethany College which had a population of around 73 students before closing in May 2015. Hepburn is also home to Hepburn School (elementary and high school) which in 2001 celebrated its 75th anniversary. It is believed to be the oldest school in Saskatchewan continuously operating in its original building.

Attractions
 Hepburn Museum of Wheat, a grain elevator built by Saskatchewan Wheat Pool in 1928 at the end of main street along the Canadian National Railway. It now stands as a museum that depicts the history of the Saskatchewan Wheat Pool, the Canadian National Railway and farmer.

See also
Saskatchewan
List of communities in Saskatchewan

References

External links
Bethany College Home Page
Museum of Wheat
Tourism Saskatchewan - Hepburn Museum of Wheat

Towns in Saskatchewan
Laird No. 404, Saskatchewan
Division No. 15, Saskatchewan